Ectropina raychaudhurii is a species of moth of the family Gracillariidae. It is known from Tamil Nadu, India.

The wingspan is 5.3-6.6 mm.

The larvae feed on Phyllanthus niruri. They mine the leaves of their host plant. The first instar larva mines the lower layer of spongy parenchyma just above the lower epidermis, and makes a small blotch-mine or sometimes a linear mine along the leaf-vein. In the second instar, the larva broadens the mine into a large blotch, which finally occupies almost the full area between two branching veins. Up to this stage, the mine is flat and seen only on the lower surface of the leaf, the mining part being whitish in colour. In the
third and fourth instars, the larva which has been transformed into tissue-feeding type, feeds on the remaining tissues within the blotch-mine. The tissues are consumed by the fourth instar larva, thus the upper epidermis of the mining part is completely separated from the lower and turns pale or deep brown in colour. The fully matured mine is slightly contorted by larval silken threads into a tentiform one. The fifth instar larva leaves the mine and migrates to another leaf, which is usually located more distally on the branch. It cuts the leaf from the edge towards the midrib. The part cut off is rolled up from the edge to form a cone on the underside of the leaf, then the larva continues to feed inside the cone. The larva passes two instars within this cone, or may changes the leaf to make another cone. When fully grown, the larva forms a whitish, spindle-shaped cocoon inside the cone, which has a small, round, semitransparent window on the side near the base.

References

Gracillariinae
Moths of Asia
Moths described in 1979